David Alan Schwedel (born July 21, 1965) is an American SMB investor known for financing businesses. Schwedel serves as an executive in multiple American companies in the manufacturing, petrochemical, energy and marine industry including Gables Energy Partners, Coalview, Encina, Electrolytic Technologies, Corallum and Uniesse.

Career
Schwedel made his first steps at 12 in the marine industry working in monthly maintenance and detailing. Then, he worked with boat manufacturers including Intrepid, Cigarette, and Bertram over several years. Schwedel began his corporate finance career in 1986 at the OLMC group of companies, a Miami venture capital firm. During his tenure at this company, he served as senior Vice president and member of their investment committee. In 2005, Schwedel founded DAS Family Holdings, L.P., a holding and investment limited partnership in industries including energy, healthcare, real estate, and corporate finance. He served the State of Florida on the Technology Leadership Council. Schwedel is a member and advocate of several Florida charitable organizations including the Florida Children's Home Society, Miami Children's Hospital, and the Phillip and Patricia Frost Museum of Science.

Schwedel serves as an executive in multiple companies in North America including:

 C.E.O and Director of Gables Energy Partners, LLC, a North American energy and chemical technology company.
 Lead investor and Executive director of Uniesse Marine Group, LLC. The company was acquired by the Miami-based Uniesse Marine Group, LLC, led by investor David Schwedel. 
 Chairman of the Board of Directors, Executive Director, and lead investor for Encina Solutions LLC.
 Executive director of Coalview, Ltd., an integrated coal technology company, specializing in coal energy and waste coal recovery.
 Executive director of Electrolytic Technologies, LLC, a manufacturer of equipment related to chemicals for water and waste water treatment.
 Founder of Corallum, its Principal, Director, General partner and also a managing member, a diversified holding and investment enterprise.
 Founder of  Florida Marine Management (MAREX) in 1992, a B2B platform for the marine industry. Since then, he serves as its Chairman, C.E.O and President from 1992 to December 24, 2002.
 He serves as Chairman of the board of Trustees for Miami Waterkeeper which supports Biscayne Bay, its watershed, and wildlife.

References

External links
Official website

Guilford College alumni
1965 births
American investors
Living people